Category 3 is known to be the third-highest classification on the Australian tropical cyclone intensity scale which is used to classify tropical cyclones.

Systems

|-
| Flora ||  ||  ||  || Northern Territory, Queensland || Extensive || None ||
|-
| Ada ||  ||  ||  || Solomon Islands || || ||
|-
| GertieFiona ||  ||  ||  || Northern Territory, Queensland || ||  ||
|-
| Althea ||  ||  ||  || Queensland ||  ||  ||
|-
| Daisy ||  ||  ||  || Queensland ||  ||  ||
|-
| Emily ||  ||  ||  || Queensland ||  ||  ||
|-
| Gail ||  ||  ||  || || || ||
|-
| Hannah ||  ||  ||  || Solomon Islands, Papua New Guinea || || ||
|-
| Jean ||  ||  ||  || || || ||
|-
| Adeline || 28–29 January 1973 ||  ||  || || || ||
|-
| Kristy ||  ||  ||  || || || ||
|-
| Nellie ||  ||  ||  || || || ||
|-
| Flores ||  ||  ||  || Indonesia || ||  ||
|-
| Marcelle ||  ||  ||  || South-Western Australia || None || None ||
|-
| Ines (1973)
|-
| Beryl (1973)
|-
| Cecily (1973)
|-
| Deidre-Delida (1973)
|-
| Helen (1974)
|-
| Zoe (1974)
|-
| Isobel (1974)
|-
| Jessie (1974)
|-
| Selma (1974)
|-
| Ray (1975)
|-
| David ||  ||  ||  || Queensland || N/A  ||  ||
|-
| Beth ||  ||  ||  || Queensland ||  ||  ||
|-
| Wally (1976)
|-
| Colin (1976)
|-
| Irene (1977)
|-
| Jack-Io (1977)
|-
| Karen (1977)
|-
| Verna ||  ||  ||  || Northern Territory || None || None ||
|-
| Vern (1978)
|-
| Peter (1978–79)
|-
| Rosa (1979)
|-
| Wilf-Danitza (1979–80)
|-
| Freda || 1981 ||  ||
|-
| Max || 1981 ||  ||
|-
| Paddy ||  ||    ||  || Western Australia || None || None ||
|-
| Alex ||  ||  ||  || None || None ||
|-
| Abigail (1982)
|-
| Ian (1982)
|-
| Ken (1983)
|-
| Lena (1983)
|-
| Naomi ||  ||  ||   ||  || None || None ||
|-
| Monty (1983)
|-
| Oscar ||  ||   ||  || None || None || None ||
|-
| Grace (1984)
|-
| Vivienne-Fanja (1984)
|-
| Willy (1984)
|-
| Annette-Jaminy (1984)
|-
| Ingrid (1984)
|-
| Jim (1984)
|-
| Emma (1984)
|-
| Frank (1984)
|-
| Nigel ||  ||  ||  || Vanuatu, Fiji || N/A ||  ||
|-
| Hubert (1985)
|-
| Isobel (1985)
|-
| Jacob (1985)
|-
| Lindsay (1985)
|-
| Margot ||  ||  ||  || Western Australia || N/A ||  ||
|-
| Nicholas (1985)
|-
| Winifred ||  ||  ||  || Queensland || $ ||  ||
|-
| Rhonda (1986)
|-
| Manu ||  ||  ||  || Papua New Guinea, Queensland || Extensive ||  ||
|-
| Namu (1986)
|-
| Connie ||  ||  ||  || Western Australia || N/A ||  ||
|-
| Jason (1987)
|-
| Frederic (1988)
|-
| Charlie (1988)
|-
| Ilona ||  ||  ||  || Western Australia  || $ ||  ||
|-
| Kirrily (1989)
|}

1990's

|-
| Felicity ||  ||  ||  || Cape York Peninsula ||  ||  ||
|-
| Sam (1990)
|-
| Vincent (1990)
|-
| Daman ||  ||  ||  || || || ||
|-
| Fran ||  ||  ||  || Tokelau, Tuvalu, Vanuatu, New CaledoniaEastern Australia, New Zealand || || ||
|-
| Polly (1993)
|-
| Adel ||  ||  ||  || Papua New Guinea || Minimal || 3 ||
|-
| Naomi ||  ||  ||  || Western Australia || N/A ||  ||
|-
| Pearl-Farah (1994 ||  ||  ||  || None ||  ||  ||
|-
| Quenton ||  ||  ||  || None ||  ||  ||
|-
| Vivienne (1994)
|-
| Violet (1995)
|-
| Warren ||  ||  ||  || Queensland, Northern Territory || N/A ||  ||
|-
| Daryl-Agnielle (1995)
|-
| Gertie ||  ||  ||  || Australia || N/A ||  || 
|-
| Hubert-Coryna (1996)
|-
| Celeste ||  ||  ||  || Queensland || N/A ||  ||
|-
| Jacob (1996)
|-
| Fergus ||  ||  ||  || Solomon Islands, New Zealand || N/A ||  ||
|-
| Rachel ||  ||  ||  || Northern Territory, Western Australia  ||  ||  ||
|-
| Justin ||  ||  ||  || Papua New Guinea, Queensland ||  ||  ||
|-
| Selwyn (1997–98)
|-
| Victor-Cindy (1998)
|-
| Alison (1998)
|-
| Billy (1998)
|-
| Damien-Birenda (1999)
|-
| Rona ||  ||  ||  || Eastern Australia, New Caledonia ||  ||  ||
|}

2000's

|-
| Kirrily ||  ||  ||  || None ||  ||  ||
|-
| Leon – Eline ||  ||  ||  || Madagascar, Southern Africa || || ||
|-
| Tessi ||  ||  ||  || Queensland ||  ||  ||
|-
| Abigail (2001)
|-
| Walter (2001)
|-
| Claudia (2002)
|-
| Dianne-Jery (2002)
|-
| Erica (2003)
|-
| Jana (2003)
|-
| Debbie (2003)
|-
| Kerry (2005)
|-
| Harvey ||  ||  ||  || Northern Territory || N/A ||  ||
|-
| Willy (2005)
|-
| Adeline-Juliet (2005)
|-
| Clare ||  ||  ||  || Western Australia ||  ||  ||
|-
| Jim (2006)
|-
| Wati (2006)
|-
| Jacob (2007)
|-
| Kara (2007)
|}

2010's

|-
| Guba ||  ||  ||  || Papua New Guinea ||  ||  ||
|-
| Nicholas ||  ||  ||  || Western Australia ||  ||   ||
|-
| Magda ||  ||  ||  || Western Australia ||  ||  ||
|-
| Paul ||  ||  ||  || Northern Territory ||  ||  ||
|-
| Dianne ||  ||  ||  || Western Australia ||  ||  ||
|-
| Carlos ||  ||  ||  || Northern Territory, Western Australia ||  ||  ||
|-
| Errol ||  ||  ||  || Timor ||  ||  ||
|-
| Alenga ||  ||  ||  || None ||  ||  ||
|-
| Heidi ||  ||  ||  || Western Australia ||  ||  ||
|-
| Lua ||  ||  ||   || Western Australia ||  || None || }
|-
| Freda ||  ||  ||  || Solomon Islands, New Caledonia ||  ||  ||
|-
| Sandra ||  ||  ||  || New Caledonia ||  ||  ||
|-
| Victoria ||  ||  ||  || None ||  ||  ||
|-
| Zane ||  ||  ||  || Papua New Guinea, Queensland ||  ||  ||
|-
| Bruce ||  ||  ||  || Cocos Islands ||  ||  ||
|-
| Jack ||   ||  ||  || None ||  ||  ||
|-
| Kate ||  ||  ||  || None ||  ||  ||
|-
| Olwyn ||  ||  ||  || Western Australia ||  ||  ||
|-
| Frances ||  ||  ||  || Papua New Guinea, Timor, Indonesia ||  ||  ||
|-
| Kelvin ||  ||  ||  || Top End, Western Australia, South Australia ||  ||  ||
|-
| Nora ||  ||  ||  || New Guinea, Northern Territory, Queensland ||  ||  ||
|-
| Owen ||  ||  ||  || Papua New Guinea, Queensland, Northern Territory ||  ||  ||
|-
| Riley ||  ||  ||  || Western Australia ||  ||  ||
|}

2020's

|-
| Claudia ||  ||  ||  || Northern Territory, Western Australia ||  ||  ||
|-
| Damien ||  ||  ||  || Northern Territory, Western Australia ||  ||  ||
|-
| Marian ||  ||  ||  || Cocos Island ||  ||  ||
|-
| Seroja ||  ||  ||  || East Timor, Indonesia, Western Australia ||  ||  ||
|-
| Gabrielle ||  ||  ||  || Solomon Islands, Norfolk Island, New Zealand || || ||
|}

Other systems

References

External links